is a 2016 Japanese fantasy anime television series. The project was announced through the opening of an official website and a video on June 10, 2016. The series, produced by Ajia-do Animation Works and directed by Masaya Fujimori, aired from October 1 to December 17, 2016.

Plot
Set in an alternate Earth on the eve of the Second World War, the story follows Izetta, the last surviving member of a clan of witches that possesses the ability to magically manipulate any object that they touch. Izetta pledges to help protect Princess Finé and the tiny Alpine country of Eylstadt from invasion by the imperialistic forces of Germania.

Characters

Main characters

Izetta, age 15, is the titular main character who met Princess Finé when they were children, and the last known descendant of the Weisse Hexe of Eylstadt (see below). Prior to the beginning of the series, she attempted to keep her witch heritage a secret by traveling around different countries with her grandmother, which made her shy and self-conscious. With the outbreak of the war she devotes herself to Finé's and Eylstadt's protection, thus breaking her taboo not to use her powers to intervene with mankind's fate. Izetta's magical powers include animating and enhancing objects into tank-busting weapons. They are, however, hugely dependent on the presence of ley lines, which, depending on her current location, limits the frequency at which she can employ them. She is usually seen riding a modified Boys anti-tank rifle in place of a broom, although she can use any rod-shaped object, such as medieval cavalry lances, in a pinch. In the first few episodes of the series, she seen riding a modified PTRS-41 anti tank rifle.

Finé is the crown Princess of Eylstadt and only heir to the throne. Tomboyish, kind, and strong-willed, she is most beloved by her people and is forced to take command of her country's defense when her father dies from illness shortly after the beginning of the Germanian invasion of Eylstadt. Finé and Izetta met in their childhood, but instead of being afraid, Finé came to admire Izetta's magical powers and became her closest friend, once even shielding her against a peasant mob who accused Izetta of setting a shed on fire. Because of her affection for her, and the role her ancestor played in the death of the original Weisse Hexe (see below), she is reluctant to send Izetta into battle, fearing for her safety.

Eylstadt
Eylstadt is a small, alpine duchy whose capital is Landsbruck. The country's location is based on what is western Austria today consisting of the states Tyrol and Vorarlberg, and its capital based on Innsbruck. The motto of its national flag reads "Ich bin tapfer und bin fromm" (literal translation: "I am valiant and am pious"). Their military equipment is patterned largely after the French Army's from the time between World War I and II. Germania intends to conquer Eylstadt simply to open a shorter road to their ally, the Romulus Federation, enabling a joint invasion of the Mediterranean and Africa.

The Archduke of Eylstadt who dies from illness soon after the Germanian invasion begins, forcing his daughter to assume the throne in his place.

Sieghart "Sieg" Müller is a counselor at the Duchal Palace, and a member of a family which has served the Duchal Family for generations. He is in charge of the principality's intelligence and counter-intelligence operations. When Jonas discovers the secret about Izetta's limits in her powers, he kills him in the name of "raison d'etat", but is haunted by his deed. For that reason, Müller loses his life in the final episode to a young Germanian soldier he has mistaken for Jonas.

Bianca is leader of Eylstadt's Royal Guard and Princess Finé's bodyguard. Initially distrustful of Izetta, she comes to care for her as much as for Finé once convinced of Izetta's sincerity.

Lotte is an energetic, happy-to-go maid in the Duchal Palace and ordered by Princess Finé to be of service to Izetta. While on chamber duties in the palace, she carries a footstool strapped to her back in order to ease her work with taller persons. Her family owns an inn in Eylstadt's old capital, where the castle of the Weisse Hexe is located.

Elvira is Princess Finé's personal tutor and a former reporter for several newspapers and radio stations in the United States of Atlanta. Upon Müller's suggestion, she is hired by the Princess to become Izetta's public advertiser in order to improve Eylstadt's morale.

The supreme commander of Eylstadt's military forces.

Finé's prime minister and one of her chief councillors.

Hans is the leader of Eylstadt's Schweizen Fortress garrison. After the fortress' fall in the beginning stage of the Germanian invasion, and his subsequent assistance to Finé and Izetta during their escape from Berkman's henchmen, he has become a trusted member of Finé's inner circle.

A spy for hire who is often employed by Müller for any shadow operations in the service of the Archduchal family.

A young spectacled soldier recently enlisted into Eylstadt's army, who is part of a large family with a younger brother and two sisters. After inadvertently overhearing a conversation about Izetta's weakness, he is critically wounded by the Germanian spy Lorenz to make him talk, and later killed by Müller to keep the information secret.

Tobias was one of Princess Finé's bodyguards who accompanied her to Westria. He is shot and killed by Berkman as he tries to help Princess Finé escape from a train.

One of Princess Finé's bodyguards who accompanied her to Westria. He is shot by Germanian secret commandos during Finé's capture in the first episode.

The Weisse Hexe (German for "white witch") is Eylstadt's legendary protector in a past age. She and a Prince of Eylstadt met and fell in love; but briefly before dying, the Prince, fearing that the story of the witch could reach the Church and put his kingdom in danger of being accused of heresy, with his last breath ordered to sell her out to the Inquisition and send her to the stake. However, using a cell sample recovered from her remains, the Germanian Weapons Design Division 9 cloned her to become Germania's own magical weapon of conquest. (See Sophie, below, for details.)

Germania
Germania is a powerful military country based on Nazi Germany, although it is portrayed as a monarchical empire similar to the pre-war German Empire. Its capital bears the name Neu-Berlin, and its appearance is patterned after Albert Speer's designs for Hitler's new "World Capital Germania". Its military standard is a diagonally shifted Balkenkreuz with a short dagger blade replacing one of its arms. The vast majority of its armor and equipment are identical to the pre- and early-WWII Wehrmacht, including the Panzer III, Panzer IV, Heinkel 111, Messerschmitt 109, Junkers Ju-87, Karabiner 98k rifles, MP40 submachine guns, etc. Its victory parole is "Sieg Reich" (derived from real Nazi Germany's "Sieg Heil"), but it is not entirely clear whether it's supposed to mean "Sieg [für das] Reich"/"Sieg [dem] Reich" (both "Victory [for the] Reich") or "siegreich" ("victorious").

Terribly cunning and a superb analyst, Berkmann is a Major (later promoted to Lieutenant Colonel) of the Germanian Special Unit. While he appears to serve his country faithfully on the surface, he is actually a cynical survivalist who shifts his loyalties as the wind of fate blows. After he is dismissed from the Germanian Witch project by Otto and thus outlived his usefulness to the Emperor, he readily sells out his knowledge to the Eylstadtians. After the end of the war, he is last seen selling himself and the secrets of Design Division 9 to the United States of Atlanta.

A clone of the original Weisse Hexe created by the Germanian Weapons Design Division 9. Born without a mind of her own, Sophie depended on Izetta's blood to awaken her consciousness. Embittered by the treason she suffered under the ancient Eylstadtians, she has become the Emperor's willing tool in their quest for world domination in exchange for being allowed to destroy all of Eylstadt personally. She uses one half of a magic stone which drains and concentrates magic from the land, but at the cost of draining its wielder of their lifeforce, as her primary weapon. She dies when Izetta concentrates all the world's magic power into one gigantic power blast, tempting her to attempt the same, thereby over-exerting herself and rendering her too weak to survive.

A Second Lieutenant in Berkmann's Special Unit, Rickert is his right-hand man and the young heir to a noble family who has decided to make his own way in the world. With the help of Germanian spy Lorenz, he infiltrates Eylstadt's old capital castle to uncover the secret room of the Weisse Hexe, but is killed by Bianca after they are found out.

The whimsical and megalomanic ruler of Germania, loosely based on both Adolf Hitler and Wilhelm II. Unlike most of his peers, he believes that witches exist since the actual existence of the Weisse Hexe was substantiated, and he intends to use their power in his bid for world conquest. He commits suicide in his bunker under the Imperial Palace in late 1941, briefly before Neu-Berlin's fall against the Allies.

Elliot is the Emperor's often-ignored prime counselor.

A Germanian air force captain and ace pilot whose squadron was wiped out by Izetta during her first rescue of Finé, and who seeks to settle the score with her to erase the blot on his pride. He leads a Germanian task force to intercept Finé before she can reach a Germanian-led surrender conference, but is unable to prevent Berkmann, whom he accuses a traitor, from defecting. Loyal to his country to the end, he departs with his plane in the final days of the war to a probable last suicide mission.

A high-ranking female Germanian officer and head of the Imperial Technology Arsenal's Design Division 9.

 

A Germanian captain and spy who has infiltrated Eylstadt's army and becomes aware of Jonas discovering Izetta's weakness. He is later killed by the Royal Guard after he and Rickert infiltrate a castle which contains the secrets of the Weisse Hexe. (Note: In English translations, his name is spelled in its anglicized form Laurence.)

Officer and leader of a Germanian task force assigned to bring Finé and Izetta to Neu-Berlin at the beginning of the series. He is killed when Izetta awakens from her suspended animation and her magic rips the plane they are travelling on in half.

 He is interested in witches and he appears to be suspicious of Izetta.

Others

The Britannian Foreign Secretary who is sympathetic to Eylstadt's cause.

Izetta's grandmother and tutor in the magic arts. She died at an unspecified time before the series' beginning, but appears several times in flashbacks whenever Izetta remembers her lessons.

Media

Anime
The series, produced by Ajia-do Animation Works, aired in Japan from October 1 to December 17, 2016. The series was simulcast by Crunchyroll, with Funimation streamed an English dub from October 19, 2016.

Episode list

Notes

References

External links
 Official website 
 

2016 anime television series debuts
Ajia-do Animation Works
Alternate history anime
Anime with original screenplays
Crunchyroll anime
Historical fantasy anime and manga
Funimation
Japanese LGBT-related animated television series
Military anime and manga
Witchcraft in anime and manga
World War II television series
Witchcraft in television
Yuri (genre) anime and manga